Sugar Island is an unincorporated community in Kankakee County, Illinois, United States. Located on the Iroquois River, the soil around this community is very fertile. The town is set up in a rectangular grid. Although Sugar Island is located in Kankakee County, it is on the border of Iroquois County.

References

External links
 Sugar Island Locator

Unincorporated communities in Illinois
Unincorporated communities in Kankakee County, Illinois